Pierre Hemmer (6 April 1912 – 23 November 1976) was a Luxembourgian middle-distance runner. He competed in the men's 800 metres at the 1936 Summer Olympics.

References

External links
 

1912 births
1976 deaths
Athletes (track and field) at the 1936 Summer Olympics
Luxembourgian male middle-distance runners
Olympic athletes of Luxembourg
Place of birth missing